Ozan Papaker (born 10 July 1996) is a Turkish footballer who plays for Boluspor.

References

External links
 
 
 

1996 births
Sportspeople from Rize
Living people
Turkish footballers
Turkey youth international footballers
Association football forwards
Çaykur Rizespor footballers
Ofspor footballers
Tuzlaspor players
Menemenspor footballers
Pendikspor footballers
Adanaspor footballers
24 Erzincanspor footballers
Boluspor footballers
Süper Lig players
TFF First League players
TFF Second League players
TFF Third League players